Chionoecetes opilio, a species of snow crab, also known as opilio crab or opies, is a predominantly epifaunal crustacean native to shelf depths in the northwest Atlantic Ocean and north Pacific Ocean. It is a well-known commercial species of Chionoecetes, often caught with traps or by trawling. Seven species are in the genus Chionoecetes, all of which bear the name "snow crab". C. opilio is related to C. bairdi, commonly known as the tanner crab, and other crab species found in the cold, northern oceans.

Anatomy 
Snow crabs have equally long and wide carapaces, or protective shell-coverings, over their bodies. Their tubercles, or the bodily projections on their shells, are moderately enclosed in calcium deposits, and they boast hooked setae, which are rigid, yet springy, hair-like organs on their claws. Snow crabs have a horizontal rostrum at the front of the carapace; the rostrum is basically just an extension of the hard, shell covering of the carapace and it boasts two flat horns separated by a gap. They have triangular spines and well-defined gastric and branchial regions internally. Snow crabs also have little granules along the border of their bodies, except their intestinal region. Concerning their walking legs, their first three are compressed; their chelipeds, or pincers, are usually smaller, shorter, or equal to their walking legs. Snow crabs are iridescent and range in color from brown to light red on top and from yellow to white on the bottom, and are bright white on the sides of their feet.

Distribution and habitat 
Snow crabs are native to the Northwest Atlantic and the North Pacific. In the Northwest Atlantic, they are found in the areas near Greenland, Newfoundland, in the Gulf of St. Lawrence, and on the Scotian Shelf. In the North Pacific, this crab is found in areas ranging from Alaska to northern Siberia, and through the Bering Strait to the Aleutian Islands, Japan, and Korea.

In 1996, they were recorded in the Barents Sea for the first time. They are considered an invasive species there, but how they arrived there is unclear. Another commercially important species, introduced deliberately to the same region, the red king crab, already has established itself in Barents Sea. Similarly, snow crabs likely will have an adverse effect on the native species of the Barents Sea.

Snow crabs are found in the ocean's shelf and upper slope, on sandy and muddy bottoms. Where male and female snow crabs are found in the ocean, depths may vary.

Diet 
Chionoecetes opilio crabs eat other invertebrates  in the benthic shelf, such as crustaceans, bivalves, brittle stars, polychaetes, and even phytobenthos and foraminiferans. Snow crabs also are scavengers, and aside from preying on other benthic shelf invertebrates, they prey on annelid worms and mollusks. Males typically prove to be better predators than mature females, and prey type depends upon predator size, with the smallest crabs feeding mainly on amphipods and ophiuroids, while the largest crabs feed mainly on annelids, crustacean decapods, and fish. Cannibalism is practised at times among snow crabs, most frequently by intermediate-sized females.

Size and population structure 

The snow crab grows slowly and is structured according to its size. At least 11  stages of growth for male crabs are recognized. Usually, the male crabs are almost twice the size of the female crabs.

Off the coast of Newfoundland, two amphipod species – Ischyrocerus commensalis and Gammaropsis inaequistylis – have been found to live on the carapace of the snow crab.

Breeding patterns 
Snow crabs have a very high reproductive potential; each year, every female carries eggs. Females are fertilised internally and can carry up to 150,000 eggs under their abdomens after mating. Females usually lay their eggs in very deep areas of the ocean, such as in deposits of phytodetritus. Males also are capable of mating at both immature and mature stages of their lives.

Snow crabs have an average lifespan of 14 to 16 years. Before their deaths, they usually moult, mate a final time, and die. New snow crab offspring hatch along with the late spring phytoplankton bloom, so they have an ample food source to take advantage of upon hatching. When they hatch, they are in the zoeal stage, meaning that they are developing into larvae that can swim on their own. Then, they metamorphose into the megalopa stage and settle to the ocean floor among the phytodetritus.

Commercial importance 
This species of crab was commonly caught by trappers in the 1980s, but trapping has decreased since then. Much of the trapping has been in Canada for commercial use. The first commercial fishing for the species in the Barents Sea (where it is an invasive species) began in 2013, and the stock of this region likely will reach levels similar to eastern Canada in the future.

Since 2016, the snow crab is at the center of a dispute over fishing rights between Norway and the EU. The EU is of the view that the crab can be freely caught by EU fishers in the international waters in the Barents Sea. Norway, for its part, argues that the crab is not a fish but a sedentary species, and therefore subject to the jurisdiction Norway exercises over the continental shelf. The Norwegian Supreme Court adopted this view in a 2019 decision.

In 2022, the Alaska Department of Fish and Game (ADF&G) banned commercial fishing of snow crabs in the Bering Sea for the first time for the 2022/23 season. The reason for this was the sharp decline in the population. It shrank from about eight billion in 2018 to one billion animals in 2021. The causes are overfishing as well as increased water temperatures as a result of climate change. Cancellation of the crab fishery has significant implications for fishermen, industry, and communities.

Taxonomy
The species was first described by Otto Fabricius in 1780, under the name Cancer phalangium, a name that was invalid due to Johan Christian Fabricius having used it previously for the species now known as Inachus phalangium. The first valid scientific name was provided by Otto Fabricius in 1788, when he redescribed the species as Cancer opilio. The type locality is Greenland.

As the genus Cancer was divided up, the species C. opilio was transferred to a new genus, Chionoecetes by Henrik Nikolai Krøyer in 1838. C. opilio was the only species in the genus at first, so it is the type species.

Mary J. Rathbun described a subspecies, C. o. elongatus, in 1924. This is now generally recognised as a full species, Chionoecetes elongatus.

Gallery

References

Further reading 

Top and Bottom Views of the Opilio, Snow Crab, Chionoecetes opilio - Dana Point Fish Company

Majoidea
Edible crustaceans
Crustaceans of the Atlantic Ocean
Crustaceans of the eastern Pacific Ocean
Crustaceans of North America
Crustaceans of the United States
Commercial crustaceans
Crustaceans described in 1788
Taxa named by Otto Fabricius